The 1977 St. Louis Tennis Classic, also known as the St. Louis WCT, was a men's professional tennis tournament that was part of the 1977 World Championship Tennis circuit. It was played on indoor carpet courts at the The Arena in St. Louis, Missouri in the United States. It was the seventh edition of the tournament and was held from March 16 through March 20, 1977. First-seeded Jimmy Connors won the singles title and earned $30,000 first-prize money.

Finals

Singles
 Jimmy Connors defeated  John Alexander 7–6(7–4), 6–2
 It was Connors' 2nd singles title of the year and the 55th of his career.

Doubles
 Ilie Năstase /  Adriano Panatta defeated  Vijay Amritraj /  Dick Stockton 6–4, 3–6, 7–6
 It was Năstase's 1st doubles title of the year and the 33rd of his career. It was Panatta's 1st doubles title of the year and the 9th of his career.

References

External links
 ITF tournament edition details

Tennis in Missouri
1977 in American tennis